Ernst Ziegler (born Ernst Aldoff, 16 April 1894 – 11 April 1974) was a German film and television actor.

Biography 
Ziegler began his film career in 1932, appearing in the German film Die verkaufte Braut (The Bartered Bride). He went on to act in other German films and on German television. In 1970, he appeared in the American film Something for Everyone, starring Angela Lansbury. His final film role was as Grandpa George (Charlie Bucket's grandfather) in the 1971 film Willy Wonka & the Chocolate Factory. By this time, Ziegler's health was deteriorating, and he was legally blind, partly as a result of being gassed during the First World War. He died of emphysema in April 1974, in West Berlin, aged 79.

Filmography

External links

1894 births
1974 deaths
German male film actors
German male television actors
Deaths from emphysema
20th-century German male actors
German blind people